Gennadiy Nikolayevich Sharipov (born 29 August 1974) is a former Uzbekistani professional footballer. He also holds Russian citizenship.

Club career
He made his professional debut in the Soviet Second League in 1990 for FC Zarafshan Navoi.

International career

References

1974 births
Living people
Russian footballers
Soviet footballers
Uzbekistani footballers
Association football defenders
FC Torpedo Miass players
Buxoro FK players
Pakhtakor Tashkent FK players
FC Lada-Tolyatti players
FC Volgar Astrakhan players
FC Vityaz Podolsk players
FC Chernomorets Novorossiysk players
FC Khimik-Arsenal players
Uzbekistan Super League players
Uzbekistan international footballers